The 1964–65 British Home Championship was an outright victory for the English football team in the run up to the 1966 FIFA World Cup which was held in the country. England's preparation for the tournament had included a rare pre-season tour of the Americas, in which they had beaten the USA 10–0 in New York, but crashed to a 1–5 defeat by Brazil in Rio de Janeiro and also lost to Argentina. The Home Championship was a close contest however and an unexpected Welsh defeat of Scotland as well as a drubbing of Ireland in their final game helped them to an impressive second. In the end however, none of the other home nations would qualify for the world cup finals, which England would go on to win.

The tournament opened with a dramatic match between England and Ireland, in which England went 4–0 up in the first half-hour, but eventually were forced to hold on in the face of an Irish counter-attack which reduced the deficit to 4–3. Fancied Scotland meanwhile began badly with a loss to Wales in Cardiff. In the second games, Ireland again ran a favorite close, eventually succumbing 3–2 to the Scots in a close game in which the lead changed several times. The Welsh too played well, only narrowly losing to eventual champions England. In the final match, the already last-placed Irish were demolished by a more driven Welsh team seeking a rare title, going down 5–0. In London, the Scots and the English fought out a 2–2 draw which put the championship out of Wales' reach by giving England five points.

Table

Results

References

External links
Full Results and Line-ups

1965
1965 in British sport
1964–65 in Northern Ireland association football
1964–65 in English football
1964–65 in Scottish football
1964–65 in Welsh football